James McCulloh may refer to:

 James Sears McCulloh (1868–1957), American business executive
 James W. McCulloh (1789–1861), American politician from Baltimore